El Tuma-La Dalia is a municipality in the Matagalpa department of Nicaragua.

References 

Municipalities of the Matagalpa Department